Ramechhap  Municipality is a municipality in Ramechhap District in Bagmati Province of Nepal. It was established on 2 December 2014 by merging the former village development committees Old-Ramechhap, Okhreni and Sukajor. At the time of the 2011 Nepal census it had a population of 28,612 people living in 6,126 individual households.

Demographics
At the time of the 2011 Nepal census, Ramechhap Municipality had a population of 29,469. Of these, 54.1% spoke Nepali, 16.7% Magar, 14.8% Tamang, 11.0% Newar, 1.5% Sunwar, 1.3% Vayu, 0.2% Maithili, 0.1% Majhi and 0.3% other languages as their first language.

In terms of ethnicity/caste, 23.6% were Newar, 21.9% Magar, 18.3% Chhetri,  15.2% Tamang, 3.6% Sunuwar, 3.3% Kami, 2.8% Hill Brahmin, 2.6% Hayu, 2.3% Sarki and 6.4% others.

In terms of religion, 79.7% were Hindu, 18.2% Buddhist, 1.0% Prakriti, 0.9% Christian and 0.2% others.

Transportation  
Ramechhap Airport lies in the neighboring municipality of Manthali.

References

Ramechhap District
Populated places in Ramechhap District